Anabella Radics (born 17 December 1968) is a Spanish former professional tennis player.

Radics, who is originally from Argentina, reached a career best singles ranking of 264. At WTA Tour level she made two main draw appearances at the Argentine Open, including in 1986 when she won through to the second round.

References

External links
 
 

1968 births
Living people
Argentine female tennis players
Spanish female tennis players